There are a number of languages spoken in Iraq, but Mesopotamian Arabic (Iraqi Arabic) is by far the most widely spoken in the country. Arabic and Kurdish are both official languages in Iraq.

Contemporary languages
The most widely spoken language in Iraq is the Arabic language (specifically Mesopotamian Arabic); the second most spoken language is Kurdish (mainly Sorani and Kurmanji dialects), followed by the Iraqi Turkmen/Turkoman dialect of Turkish, and the Syriac (referring to Neo-Aramaic languages, specifically: Assyrian Neo-Aramaic, Chaldean Neo-Aramaic, and Mandean Neo-Aramaic).

Standard Arabic is written using the Arabic script but Mesopotamian Arabic is written with a modified Perso-Arabic script and so is Kurdish (see Sorani alphabet). In 1997 the Iraqi Turkmen/Turkoman adopted the Turkish alphabet as the formal written language and by 2005 the community leaders decided that the Turkish language would replace traditional Turkmeni (which had used the Arabic script) in Iraqi schools.  In addition, the Neo-Aramaic languages use the Syriac script.

Other smaller minority languages include Shabaki and Armenian.

Official languages
Official languages of Iraq are defined by the Constitution of Iraq, that was adopted on September 18, 2005 by the Transitional National Assembly of Iraq. It was confirmed by constitutional referendum, held on October 15, 2005. Official text of the Constitution was published on December 28, 2005 in the Official Gazette of Iraq (No. 4012), in Arabic original, and thus came into force. Official translation (in English language, for international use) was produced in cooperation between Iraqi state authorities and the United Nations' Office for Constitutional Support.

According to the Article 4 of the Constitution, Arabic and Kurdish are the official languages of Iraq, while three other languages: Turkish, Syriac and Armenian, are recognized as minority languages. In addition, any region or province may declare other languages official if a majority of the population approves in a general referendum.

Term "Syriac" is used in the Constitution as an official designation for the minority language of Neo-Aramaic-speaking communities, including speakers of Assyrian Neo-Aramaic, Chaldean Neo-Aramaic, and Mandean Neo-Aramaic languages. Constitutional recognition of Syriac (Neo-Aramaic) was the result of political changes in Iraq, that occurred after 2003.

History
The oldest recorded languages of Iraq were Sumerian language and Akkadian language (including ancient Assyrian and Babylonian). Sumerian was displaced by Akkadian by 1700 BCE, and Akkadian was gradually displaced by Aramaic, from 1200 BCE to 100 CE. Sumerian and Akkadian (including all ancient Assyrian and Babylonian dialects) were written in the cuneiform script from 3300 BCE onwards. The latest positively identified Akkadian text comes from the first century CE.

The language with the longest recorded period of use in Iraq is Aramaic, which has a written tradition dating back for more than 2000 years, and survives today in its descendants, the Neo-Aramaic languages.

References

Sources

External links 

 Constitution of Iraq, from official Iraqi an UN sources, also accepted as Wikisource text
 Iraq, Ministry of Interior - General Directorate for Nationality: Iraqi Constitution (2005) 
 UNESCO: Iraqi Constitution (2005)
 UN WIPO: Iraqi Constitution (2005)

 Other links